Um Cheon-Ho (Hangul: 엄천호, Hanja: 嚴天顥) (born 25 February 1992) is a South Korean short track speed skater.

External links

Profile from 2011 Asian Winter Games official website

1992 births
Living people
South Korean male short track speed skaters
Asian Games medalists in short track speed skating
Asian Games gold medalists for South Korea
Asian Games silver medalists for South Korea
Short track speed skaters at the 2011 Asian Winter Games
Medalists at the 2011 Asian Winter Games
Universiade medalists in short track speed skating
Universiade silver medalists for South Korea
Competitors at the 2013 Winter Universiade
21st-century South Korean people